__notoc__

A wordmark, word mark, or logotype, is usually a distinct text-only typographic treatment of the name of a company, institution, or product name used for purposes of identification and branding. Examples can be found in the graphic identities of the Government of Canada, FedEx, and Microsoft. The organization name is incorporated as a simple graphic treatment to create a clear, visually memorable identity. The representation of the word becomes a visual symbol of the organization or product.

In the United States and European Union, a wordmark may be registered, making it a protected intellectual property. 

In the United States, the legal term "word mark" refers not to the graphical representation but to only the text. 

In most cases, wordmarks cannot be copyrighted, as they do not reach the threshold of originality.

The wordmark is one of several different types of logos, and is among the most common. It has the benefit of containing the brand name of the company (i.e. the Coca-Cola logo) as opposed to the brandmark used by, for example, Apple.

Wordmark logos are often confused with lettermark logos. Lettermark logos are made up of the initials of the brand name or business, while wordmarks contain the full name. Lettermarks are also text-only but they are shorter. Some examples of lettermark logos include: IBM, CNN, P&G, HBO, and LG logo.

See also
Logo
Icon
Slogan
Trademark

Notes

References

Further reading

McWade, John. Before and After Graphics for Business. Peachpit Press: 2005. .
White, Alexander W. The Elements of Graphic Design: Space, Unity, Page Architecture, and Type. Allworth: 2002. .
Wheeler, Alina. Designing Brand Identity: A Complete Guide to Creating, Building, and Maintaining Strong Brands. Wiley: 2006. .

 
Brand management
Promotion and marketing communications
Typography